Television in the Netherlands was officially introduced in 1951. In the Netherlands, the television market is divided between a number of commercial networks, such as RTL Nederland, and a system of public broadcasters sharing three channels, NPO 1, NPO 2, and NPO 3. Imported programmes (except those for children), as well as news interviews with responses in a foreign language, are almost always shown in their original language, with subtitles.

Reception
In the Netherlands, television can be watched analog or digital (the latter with the option of HDTV or UHD). Over 2018, 89.2% of Dutch viewers received television digitally. Analogue television is only available via some cable operators and some fiber to the home providers, since the Dutch government ended analogue reception via airwaves in 2006. Dutch largest cable company Ziggo began to phase out the analogue signal in 2018. Watching digital television is possible through a variety of ways, the most common being:
Digital television over cable (in most cases through a set-top box with a smart card or through a Conditional-access module).
Ziggo is the major supplier of cable television in the Netherlands. Other companies are Caiway, DELTA, Kabelnoord and a few smaller local companies.
Satellite television
Canal Digitaal is the only satellite provider.
Digital terrestrial television
KPN Digitenne is the only terrestrial provider.
Internet television (IPTV)
KPN, Tele2 and T-Mobile are the major suppliers of IPTV.
Fiber to the home
 KPN is the major operator of FTTH with its subsidiaries KPN Glasvezel, Glashart and Reggefiber. Other companies are Caiway and DELTA.

Which television channels can be received is heavily dependent on the operator and in most cases also the channel package that is paid for. However, there is a small selection of channels that every operator must carry. Since 2014, these are the following channels:
NPO 1
NPO 2
NPO 3
één (Flanders (Belgium))
Canvas (Flanders (Belgium))
Ketnet (Flanders (Belgium))
Regional (provincial) broadcasters (when available) 
Local broadcaster (when available)

Public channels
The Netherlands has three nationwide channels for publicly funded television (NPO). These channels can only make a fixed maximum amount of money from commercials. These commercials never interrupt broadcasts, and are only shown in between shows. The broadcasting organisations that use these channels are basically representative of the Dutch society. Every broadcasting company has members and the number of members gives them a status that is connected to the number of hours of broadcasting. Acceptance or refusal of entry is decided politically on the guidance of public opinion.

In 2005, there was a sharp political debate over government plans to cut funding to public broadcasters and to abolish statutory broadcaster NPS.

National
The three national television channels are:
 NPO 1
 NPO 2
 NPO 3
 NPO Zapp
 NPO Zappelin

Thematic
The three digital television channels that are provided by the Nederlandse Publieke Omroep organisation, are:
 NPO 1 Extra
 NPO 2 Extra
 NPO Politiek en Nieuws

International
There is also an international public channel:
 BVN, It shows the best of Dutch public television for Dutch viewers abroad. It was also formerly shared with Belgium's publicly funded Flemish television channel VRT.

Regional
Most regions and provinces have their own television channel as well. These also receive government funding:
 AT5 (Greater Amsterdam)
 Omrop Fryslân (Friesland), in West Frisian and Dutch
 RTV Noord (Groningen)
 RTV Drenthe (Drenthe)
 RTV Oost (Overijssel)
 Omroep Flevoland (Flevoland)
 TV Gelderland (Gelderland)
 RTV Utrecht (Utrecht)
 NH (North Holland)
 RTV Rijnmond (Rotterdam)
 TV West (South Holland)
  (Limburg)
 Omroep Brabant TV (North Brabant)
 Omroep Zeeland (Zeeland)

Commercial channels

RTL Nederland
RTL 4
RTL 5
RTL 7
RTL 8
RTL Z
RTL Crime
RTL Lounge
RTL Telekids

Talpa Network
Talpa TV
Net5
SBS6 
Veronica
SBS9
TV 538

Paramount Networks EMEAA
Comedy Central
MTV
MTV 80s
MTV 90s
MTV 00s
MTV Hits
MTV Live
Nickelodeon
Nick Jr.
Nicktoons
NickMusic
Paramount Network

Warner Bros. Discovery
Animal Planet
Boomerang
Cartoon Network
CNN International
Discovery Channel
Discovery Science
Eurosport 1
Eurosport 2
Investigation Discovery
TLC

The Walt Disney Company
24Kitchen
BabyTV (Distribution only)
Disney XD, formerly known as Jetix.
Disney Channel
ESPN (through Eredivisie Media & Marketing CV)
Fox (through Eredivisie Media & Marketing CV)
National Geographic
National Geographic Wild

VodagoneZiggo
Ziggo Sport
Ziggo Sport Select
Ziggo Sport Voetbal
Ziggo Sport Golf
Ziggo Sport Racing
Ziggo Sport Docu
Ziggo Sport Tennis
Ziggo TV

AMC Networks International
AMC Networks International UK
CBS Reality, joint venture of AMC and CBS
Extreme Sports Channel
ShortsTV, joint venture of AMC and Shorts International

NBCUniversal International Networks
CNBC Europe
DreamWorks Channel
E!
Sky News

SPI International
DocuBox
FightBox
Film1
Film1 Premiere
Film1 Action
Film1 Family
Film1 Drama
FilmBox

BBC Studios
 BBC Entertainment
 BBC First
 BBC World News

A&E Networks
Crime & Investigation
History

Stingray Digital
Stingray Classica
Stingray Djazz
Stingray iConcerts
Stingray Lite TV

Muziekkiosk
Nashville TV
SchlagerTV
TV Oranje

RadioCorp BV
100% NL TV
Slam!TV

Other
The following (international) commercial channels broadcast localized versions of their programs:

192TV
Curiosity Channel
DanceTelevision
Duck TV
Euronews
Family 7, conservative Christian channel
FashionTV
Horse & Country TV
Love Nature
Njam!
ONS, Dutch Nostalgia Channel
OutTV, gay lifestyle
Pebble TV, Dutch Children's Channel
Tommy TV
Xite, Dutch Music Channel
AFTV-African Television (English), available in The Hague and online, targeting Africans in the Netherlands
NOS TV (Papiamento), available on Bonaire and online; local Bonaire TV station.
RTV-7, (Papiamento, English); Rebroadcast of Antillian TV Channels in the Netherlands

Foreign domestic channels
While there are many localised versions of international channels meant for the Dutch market, many television providers also broadcast 'domestic television' networks as part of the basic subscription package. Other 'domestic' channels may be received as part of extended packages. Many basic subscriptions include:

Belgium
 één (Flanders)
 Canvas (Flanders)
 Ketnet (Flanders)

United Kingdom
 BBC One
 BBC Two
 BBC Three
 BBC Four
 CBBC
 Cbeebies

Germany
 Das Erste
 ZDF 
 WDR Fernsehen
 NDR Fernsehen
 RTL 
 Sat.1
 3sat
 Arte Deutschland

France
 France 2
 TV5 Monde Europe
 Arte France
 Mezzo

Italy
 Mediaset Italia
 Rai 1

Other
 TVE Internacional (Spain)
 TRT Türk (Turkey)
 Al Jazeera English
 CGTN
 Utsav Gold
 Utsav Plus

High-definition
In the Netherlands customers can receive high-definition television channels by cable or satellite. Until 2018 there was no terrestrial HD service available. KPN started to switch its digital terrestrial television platform to the DVB-T2 HEVC standard in October 2018, this transition completed on 9 July 2019.

The first trials with high-definition television in the Netherlands began in 2006 with the broadcast of the 2006 World Cup in HD. After the trial the larger cable companies continued a HD service with a small number of channels such as National Geographic Channel HD, Discovery HD Showcase, History HD, Film1 HD and Sport1 HD. The demand for HD was low because no Dutch network had made the move to HD. Broadcasting in widescreen and the quality of the standard-definition PAL signal was good enough for most people.

Since the 2006 trials, none of the main Dutch networks made the move to HD. This changed in the summer of 2008 when from 1 June 2008 until 24 August 2008, the Netherlands Public Broadcasting (NPO) organisations made their primary channel, Nederland 1 temporary available in HD. This made it possible to broadcast Euro 2008, the 2008 Tour de France, and the 2008 Summer Olympics in HD and additionally allowed them to test their systems before the scheduled launch of their permanent HD service in early 2009. The NPO planned to launch their permanent HD service with HD versions of their three channels Nederland 1, Nederland 2, and Nederland 3. Most of the programming in the early stages consisted of upscaled material from their SD channels as in time more programs became available in HD. , the company responsible for the technical realisation of the broadcasts of the NPOs television and radio channels, began the summer 2008 test broadcast of Nederland 1 HD in 720p/50 as the European Broadcasting Union (EBU) recommends. During the test period an additional 1080i/25 version of the channel was made available to the cable companies because of quality complaints from viewers. In 2009 the NPO decided to adopt the 1080i/25 HD standard.

The main commercial broadcasting organizations in the Netherlands the SBS Broadcasting Group (NET 5, SBS 6, Veronica) and the channels of RTL Nederland followed in HD via cable and satellite, using the same HD standard as the NPO.

Ultra-high-definition
The first television channels in 4K UHD were officially launched in the Netherlands in 2017. In April 2017, satellite provider CanalDigitaal added Insight TV 4K UHD in its channel line-up. After more than a year of testing, KPN launched ultra-high-definition television on 1 July 2017, with Xite 4K and Hispasat 4K TV. Eurosport 4K launched in the Netherlands on 5 June 2018. NPO 1 launched its first trials with ultra-high-definition television through KPN, CanalDigitaal and some minor networks on 14 June 2018, using the HLG standard. Ziggo Sport is available in UHD from March 2021.

Defunct or rebranded channels
 13th Street (30 May 2007 – 1 July 2016)
 Action Now! (16 May 2006 – 31 May 2009)
 Adventure One (1999–2007), replaced by National Geographic Wild (2007–present)
 BBC Prime (1995–2009), replaced by BBC Entertainment (2009–present)
 The Box/The Box Comedy (1995 – 30 April 2007), replaced by Comedy Central (30 April 2007 – present)
 CineNova (18 May 2000 – 18 May 2005)
 CMT Europe (October 1992 – 31 March 1998)
 Comedy Central Extra (1 November 2011 – 31 December 2022)
 Comedy Central Family (1 October 2008 – 31 May 2018), its programmes merged with Comedy Central Extra
 Consumenten 24 (formerly Consumenten TV)
 DanceTrippin TV (2011 – May 2018), rebranded by DanceTelevision (May 2018 – present)
 Discovery Civilisation (1 October 1998 - 18 April 2008), rebranded by Discovery World (18 April 2008 - 31 December 2020)
 Discovery Travel & Living (September 1999 – 4 July 2011), replaced by Investigation Discovery and TLC (4 July 2011 – present)
 Disney Junior (3 May 2010 – 1 April 2019), formerly known as Playhouse Disney.
 ESPN America (5 December 2002 – 1 August 2013)
 ESPN Classic (13 March 2006 – 1 August 2013)
 Euro 7 (19 October 1994 – 28 March 1997)
 Family 24
 Film1 Sundance (1 March 2012 – 31 August 2017) / Film1 Festival (1 February 2006 – 1 March 2012)
 Filmnet (1984–1997), replaced by Canal+ (1997–2006), followed by Film1 (1 February 2006 – present)
 Fine Living (1 September 2015 – 31 January 2019)
 Food Network (22 April 2010 – 31 January 2019)
 Fox Kids (2 August 1997 – 12 February 2005), rebranded by Jetix (13 February 2005 – 31 December 2009) followed by Disney XD (1 January 2010 – present)
 Fox Life (7 September 2009 – 31 December 2016)
Fox Sports Eredivisie, 3 pay-TV channels (29 August 2008 – 1 January 2021), rebranded by ESPN
Fox Sports International 3 pay-TV channels (17 August 2013 – 1 January 2021), rebranded by ESPN
 Geschiedenis 24 (formerly Geschiedenis)
 GoedTV (April 2006 – 6 December 2015)
 Hallmark Channel (June 1995 – 20 July 2011)
 HBO 1/2/3 (9 February 2012 – 31 December 2016)
 Het Gesprek (2 October 2007 – 21 August 2010)
 JimJam (10 October 2006 – 1 March 2018)
 Kindernet (1 March 1988 – 1 September 2003, 4 April 2011 – 1 November 2013)
 MGM Channel (2001 – 5 November 2014), replaced by AMC (5 November 2014 – 31 December 2018)
 MisdaadNet (1 July 2008 – 1 September 2011), replaced by RTL Crime (1 September 2011 – present)
 Motors TV (1 September 2000 – 28 February 2017), rebranded by Motorsport.tv (1 March 2017 – 30 September 2018)
 MTV Brand New (1 August 2006 - 31 January 2021), replaced by MTV Hits (1 February 2021 - present)
 MTV Music 24 (1 September 2011 - 25 May 2021), replaced by MTV 90s (26 May 2021 - present)
 NBC Super Channel (30 January 1987 – 30 June 1998), replaced by National Geographic (1 July 1998 – present)
 NostalgieNet (1 January 2006 – 13 September 2015), rebranded by ONS (13 September 2015 – present) 
 NPO 3 Extra (31 October 2006 – 25 December 2018), between 2006 and 2014 named 101 TV and between 2014 and 2018 named NPO 101.
 NPO Doc (1 December 2004 as Holland Doc 24 – 1 July 2016)
 NPO Humor TV (15 November 2006 as Humor TV 24 – 1 July 2016)
 NPO Nieuws (1 December 2004 as Journaal 24 - 15 December 2021) 
 NPO Zappelin Extra (30 May 2009 as Z@ppelin / Z@pp 24, renamed by NPO Zapp Xtra between 2014 and 2018, ceased on 15 December 2021)
 Revolt (1 November 2019 - 31 January 2021)
 RTL-Véronique (2 October 1989 – 17 September 1990), rebranded by RTL 4 (18 September 1990 – present)
 Spike (1 October 2015 - 24 May 2022), rebranded by Paramount Network (24 May 2022 - present)
 Spirit 24 (formerly Geloven)
 Sport 7 (18 August 1996 – 8 December 1996)
 Sportnet (29 March 1984 – 1 March 1993), merged with Eurosport (5 February 1989 – present)
 Sterren 24 (formerly Sterren.nl)
 Stingray Brava (2007 – 1 March 2019), replaced by Stingray Classica (1 March 2019 – present)
 SuperSport (1995–1997), replaced by Canal+ (1997–2006) followed by Sport1 (1 February 2006 – 12 November 2015), rebranded by Ziggo Sport Totaal (12 November 2015 – present)
 Syfy (30 May 2007 – 1 July 2016)
 Talpa (13 August 2005 – 15 December 2005), rebranded by Tien (16 December 2005 – 17 August 2007) followed by RTL 8 (18 August 2007 – present)
 TMF (1 May 1995 – 1 September 2011)
 TMF Dance (1 May 2005 – 31 December 2011)
 TMF NL (1 May 2005 – 31 December 2011)
 TMF Pure (1 May 2005 – 31 December 2011)
 TNT Classic Movies (17 September 1993 – 15 October 1999) rebranded by TCM (15 October 1999 – 1 January 2014)
 TNT (24 January 2013 – 1 January 2014)
 Travel Channel (1996 – 31 January 2019)
 TV10 (never launched due to license problems, 1989)
 TV10 Gold (1 May 1995 – 31 January 1996), rebranded a couple of times afterwards. First by TV10 (1 February 1996 – 18 December 1998) followed by FOX (19 December 1998 - August 1999), Fox 8 (September 1999 – 30 April 2001), V8 (1 May 2001 – 19 September 2003) and finally by Veronica (20 September 2003 – present)
 Veronica (1 September 1995 – 1 April 2001), rebranded by Yorin (2 April 2001 – 11 August 2005), and again rebranded by RTL 7 (12 August 2005 – present)
 VH1 (June 1999 - 2 August 2021), rebranded by MTV 00s (2 August 2021 - present)
 VH1 Classic (30 November 2004 – 5 October 2020), rebranded by MTV 80s (5 October 2020 – present)
 Viceland (1 March 2017 – 31 October 2019), rebranded by VICEtv (1 November 2019 – 24 August 2020)
 Vesta TV (October 1995 – July 1996)
 Weerkanaal (15 February 2006 – December 2008), rebranded by Weer en Verkeer (December 2008 – 1 October 2013)
 Ziggo Sport Extra (12 November 2015 - 28 February 2021), rebranded by Ziggo Sport Tennis (1 March 2021 - present)
 Zone Club (1998 – 1 April 2010)
 Zone Horror (30 October 2006 – 1 July 2009)
 Zone Reality (10 October 2002 – 2 December 2012), rebranded by CBS Reality (2 December 2012 – present)

Television in other languages
To serve those who have another native language than Dutch, there are few television channels in the Netherlands broadcasting in one of the regional languages of The Netherlands. Those broadcasting in English usually target an international audience as well. Most of these channels broadcast through the internet only or have a very limited broadcasting area, with Omrop Fryslân as most notable exception. These channels are:
 Omrop Fryslân (Frisian), public access regional broadcaster in the province of Friesland
 Froeks.tv (Frisian), web-only channel for Friesland
 Radio Netherlands Worldwide (English), produces vodcasts on their website in English
 ThreeNL (English), reruns of Dutch public access programmes either English subtitled or dubbed
 AFTV-African Television (English), available in The Hague and online, targeting Africans in The Netherlands
 NOS TV (Papiamento), available on Bonaire and online; local Bonaire TV station.
 RTV-7 (Papiamento, English), available on Ziggo, XS4ALL and KPN. Rebroadcast of Antillian TV Channels in the Netherlands

Timeline

See also 
 Digital television in the Netherlands
 History of Dutch television
 Lists of television channels
 List of cable companies in the Netherlands
 Media in the Netherlands

References

External links
http://gids.omroep.nl (in Dutch) shows programming of Dutch and other stations of surrounding countries
http://www.uitzendinggemist.nl (in Dutch) Web site archive of internet-streaming TV programs from the Netherlands
Dutch public access programmes in English to be watched on YouTube